In Greek mythology, King Lyncus ([ˈ] Greek:) of the Scythians was taught the arts of agriculture by Triptolemus but he refused to teach it to his people and then tried to kill Triptolemus. Demeter turned him into a lynx as punishment.

Mythology 
The myth is not known from any extant Greek sources, but it is found in Ovid's Metamorphoses 5.648-661 

 Now the youth [i.e. Triptolemus] was carried high over Europe and Asia. He turned his face towards Scythia where Lyncus was king. He stood before the king's household gods. He was asked how he had come there, and the reason for his journey, his name, and his country. He said 'Athens, the famous city, is my home, Triptolemus, my name. I came not by ship, on the sea, or by foot, overland. The clear air parted for me. I bring you the gifts of Ceres. If you scatter them through the wide fields, they will give you back fruitful harvests, and ripening crops.' The barbarian was jealous. So that he might be the author, of so great a gift, he received him like a guest, but attacked Triptolemus, with a sword, while he was in deep sleep. As he attempted to pierce the youth's breast, Ceres turned the king into a lynx, then ordered the youth Athenian to drive the sacred yoke back through the air.

Notes

References 

 Gaius Julius Hyginus, Fabulae from The Myths of Hyginus translated and edited by Mary Grant. University of Kansas Publications in Humanistic Studies. Online version at the Topos Text Project.
 Maurus Servius Honoratus, In Vergilii carmina comentarii. Servii Grammatici qui feruntur in Vergilii carmina commentarii; recensuerunt Georgius Thilo et Hermannus Hagen. Georgius Thilo. Leipzig. B. G. Teubner. 1881. Online version at the Perseus Digital Library.
 Publius Ovidius Naso, Metamorphoses translated by Brookes More (1859-1942). Boston, Cornhill Publishing Co. 1922. Online version at the Perseus Digital Library.
 Publius Ovidius Naso, Metamorphoses. Hugo Magnus. Gotha (Germany). Friedr. Andr. Perthes. 1892. Latin text available at the Perseus Digital Library.

 Kings in Greek mythology
 Mythological felines
 Metamorphoses into animals in Greek mythology
Deeds of Demeter